Afsana Khan is an Indian  Punjabi playback singer, actress and songwriter. She started her career as a participant in the singing reality show, Voice of Punjab Season 3 in 2012. She is known for her tracks "Titliaan" written by Jaani and "Dhakka" with Sidhu Moose Wala. In 2021, she participated in the reality show Bigg Boss 15.

Career 
In 2012, Afsana participated in the singing reality show Voice of Punjab Season 3 and reached the top 5 of the show.
In 2017, Khan appeared in the singing reality show Rising Star Season 1 as a contestant where she finished in Top 7. During an interview, Afsana shared that she didn't know any Bollywood song when she appeared for the auditions of the show. She prepared the song "Jag Suna Suna Lage" on the auditions venue itself and got selected for the show.  Afterwards she started singing in the Punjabi music industry with various labels.

Filmography

Television

Selected discography

Singles

Selected songs
 Lala Lori
 Jaani Ve Jaani
 Dhakka
 Naina De Thekay
 Dila Himmat Kar
 Gutt Utte
 Chandigarh Shehr
 Black Night
 Maarna A Menu
 Nakhre Jatti De
 Tera Pyaar
 Jine Dukh
 Badmashi
 Vailpuna
 Hawa Karda
 Unf*ckwithable ft. Sidhu Moosewala (bonus track from Moosetape)
 Tere Laare
 Na Maar
 Mere Kol

Controversy 
When Afsana Khan visited her own school, a government senior secondary school at Badal village in the district and sang some lines of her song Dhakka, the video went viral. A complaint was filed against her to the police since the song seemed to promote gun culture.

References

External links 

Punjabi-language singers
Punjabi singers
Living people
Bigg Boss (Hindi TV series) contestants
Year of birth missing (living people)